Boresight may refer to:
 Antenna boresight, the optical axis of a directional antenna
 Boresight (firearm), adjustments made to an optical sight, to align the barrel of a firearm with the sights
 Boresight point, also known as gun harmonisation, the alignment of weapons in an aircraft
 Project Boresight, a US radio direction finding system